Harvey Read Saunders (born 20 July 1997) is an English professional footballer who plays for Tranmere Rovers as a striker.

Early and personal life
Saunders is from Staindrop. He is nicknamed "Rooster".

Career
Saunders joined local club Barnard Castle at the age of 6 or 7, leaving at under-14s after the club folded. He occasionally played rugby for a local club and then began working full-time in an Indian restaurant. The restaurant entered a team into a football competition, which they won. Saunders then began playing Sunday League football, before signing for Darlington Railway Athletic, initially at under-18 level but then for the senior team. He then played for Bishop Auckland and Durham City. He then signed for Darlington, making his debut in January 2017. Whilst at Darlington he had loan spells at Ryhope Colliery Welfare and Dunston UTS. In total he scored 11 goals in 66 league games for Darlington.

Fleetwood Town
He signed for Fleetwood Town in January 2019 for an undisclosed fee, on a -year contract, and was immediately loaned back to Darlington.

He made his first-team debut for Fleetwood on 3 September 2019 in the EFL Trophy. He scored his first goals for Fleetwood when he scored twice in an EFL Trophy tie against Carlisle United on 1 September 2020, and his first league goal followed in a 2–1 defeat to Rochdale on 3 October 2020. On 6 October 2020 Saunders scored a hat-trick in the EFL Trophy against Aston Villa U21s.

He signed on loan for Hartlepool United on 22 April 2021.

At the end of the 2020–21 season, Saunders was released by Fleetwood Town.

Bristol Rovers
On 25 June 2021, Saunders agreed to join Bristol Rovers on a two-year deal from the expiration of his Fleetwood contract. Saunders joined former Fleetwood teammates Paul Coutts and Sam Finley in joining former manager Joey Barton that summer. On 7 August 2021, Saunders made his debut for the club in a 2–1 opening day defeat to Mansfield Town, playing the full match on account of the fact that he was the club's only fit striker. On 17 August 2021, Saunders scored his first goal for the club with the only goal in a victory over Oldham Athletic, the club's first win of the season, heading home a cross from Harry Anderson via a deflection. After suffering an injury during an aerial collision in a match against Bradford City on 16 October, Saunders was ruled out until the new year with torn ankle ligaments. On 29 January 2022, Saunders made his return to action from the bench as he assisted Rovers' late winner to defeat Walsall.

Tranmere Rovers
On 27 January 2023, Saunders signed for League Two club Tranmere Rovers for an undisclosed fee on an eighteen-month contract. The club had previously tried to sign him in the summer.

Career statistics

Honours
Bristol Rovers
League Two promotion: 2021–22

References

1997 births
Living people
English footballers
Association football forwards
Darlington Railway Athletic F.C. players
Bishop Auckland F.C. players
Durham City A.F.C. players
Darlington F.C. players
Ryhope Colliery Welfare F.C. players
Dunston UTS F.C. players
Fleetwood Town F.C. players
Hartlepool United F.C. players
Bristol Rovers F.C. players
Tranmere Rovers F.C. players
English Football League players
National League (English football) players
People from Staindrop
Footballers from County Durham